This page shows the progress of Gillingham F.C. in the 2010–11 football season. This year they play their games in League Two in the English league system.

Results

League Two

FA Cup

League Cup

Football League Trophy

League data

League table

Results summary

Appearances and goals
As of 6 May 2011.
(Substitute appearances in brackets)

Awards

Transfers

References

Gillingham
Gillingham F.C. seasons